Aksel Nikolajsen (9 February 1901 – 18 March 1993) was a Danish athlete. He competed in the men's pole vault at the 1928 Summer Olympics.

References

1901 births
1993 deaths
Athletes (track and field) at the 1928 Summer Olympics
Danish male pole vaulters
Olympic athletes of Denmark
Place of birth missing